Surrey county cricket teams have been traced back to the 17th century, but Surrey's involvement in cricket goes back much further than that. The first definite mention of cricket anywhere in the world is dated c.1550 in Guildford.

17th century
Cricket became established in Surrey during the 17th century and the earliest village matches took place before the English Civil War. It is believed that the earliest county teams were formed in the aftermath of the Restoration in 1660.

18th century
The first recorded inter-county match took place in 1709 between Kent and Surrey.

Surrey teams held first-class status throughout the 18th century, depending on the quality of their opponents, largely due to the Chertsey Cricket Club and famous patrons such as Charles Bennet, 4th Earl of Tankerville. Noted Surrey players included Lumpy Stevens, William Yalden and Billy Beldham.

19th century
The present Surrey County Cricket Club was formed at a meeting which took place at the Horns Tavern in Kennington following a match between Gentlemen of Surrey and Players of Surrey at The Oval (in its initial season as a cricket ground) on 21 & 22 August 1845. The earliest important match at The Oval was Surrey Club v Marylebone Cricket Club (MCC) on 25 & 26 May 1846. Only 194 runs were scored in the match with a top score of 13. W. R. Hillyer took 14 wickets to help MCC win by 48 runs. Surrey County Cricket Club played its first important match v Kent at The Oval on 25 & 26 June 1846, winning by 10 wickets.

For the history of Surrey cricket since the foundation of the county club, see : Surrey County Cricket Club.

References

External links
 Chertsey Cricket Club website

History of Surrey
English cricket teams in the 18th century
English cricket in the 19th century
Former senior cricket clubs
Cricket in Surrey
Cricket teams in London